Maliyakhe Lymon Shelembe is a South African politician. Shelembe was an Inkatha Freedom Party member until 2011. He was elected to the National Assembly in 2014 as a member of the National Freedom Party. Shelembe became a Democratic Alliance MP after the 2019 elections.

Political career
He was elected as a ward councillor for the Inkatha Freedom Party in 2001. Later that year, he was elected Deputy Mayor of the Umtshezi Local Municipality. He eventually became mayor of the municipality.

The African National Congress won control of the municipality in 2004 and Shelembe became an ordinary council member. In 2007, he returned to the position of mayor. In 2011, he joined the newly created National Freedom Party and was elected as deputy mayor of the Uthukela District Municipality after that year's municipal elections. He was elected the party's national chairperson in December 2011.

Shelembe was elected to the National Assembly  in 2014. In March 2019, he became a member of the Democratic Alliance and returned to parliament after the general elections in May that year. In June 2019, he was appointed as shadow deputy minister of Defence and Military Veterans. Shelembe remained in the position following John Steenhuisen's election as parliamentary leader.

References

External links
National Assembly profile

Living people
Year of birth missing (living people)
Zulu people
Members of the National Assembly of South Africa
Democratic Alliance (South Africa) politicians
Inkatha Freedom Party politicians
Mayors of places in South Africa
National Freedom Party politicians